Eva ("The Daughter of Dracula" or "Daughter of The Dragon") is a fictional comic book character created and published by Dynamite Entertainment. She is a vampire hunter who is the daughter of Count Dracula. She first appeared in Dynamite's Army of Darkness comics during the Ash vs. The Classic Monsters storyline.

Fictional biography

Origin 
Vlad Tepes was a Transylvanian warlord in the 15th century who led a long a brutal campaign against the invading Turks of the Ottoman Empire, who sought to expand into Eastern Europe and root out Catholicism as the ruling faith in favor of their own Islam, killing all who opposed. His favored method of tormenting his foes was to impale them alive on long wooden pikes and set them up on display as a warning to his detractors. This earned him such infamous monikers as "Vlad the Impaler" and "Dracula" - an old Romanian namesake which means "Son of the Devil." Despite his numerous victories, his gentle wife could not endure his increasing ruthlessness and thus chose to end her own life even while still heavily pregnant - depriving Vlad of the one thing he desired more than victory: an heir to carry on his name should he fall in battle.

Upon discovering her body, a despondent Vlad begged God to raise his wife and child from death. Hearing his pleas, a demon manifested before him masquerading as an angel. This creature formed a covenant with Vlad - remaking him into an "angel" as well to serve the will of "God." Upon completing his conversion, Dracula realized that his wife and child had not risen from death as he was promised. Enraged and now mad with bloodlust, Vlad cursed God for his misfortunes. In one final act of dignity, he had their bodies buried in holy soil far from his castle. Unbeknownst to Dracula, however, the demon had only partially fulfilled its part of the covenant; raising the unborn child from death and sending a she-wolf to dig her from the grave and nurse her as one of its own before being discovered by Father Miran of the Rosebud Monastery.

Army of Darkness: Ash vs. The Classic Monsters (2006) 
When Ash Williams went back in time to Transylvania, 1499 to retrieve The Spike of The Crucifixion, he met Eva and brought her back to modern-New York City, where Dracula was attempting to take over the world with an army of the undead. She "killed" her father with The Spike of The Crucifixion.

Powers and abilities
As she was resurrected by the same power which transformed her father into a vampire, Eva has inherited numerous abilities which allow her to stand toe-to-toe against any mundane creature such as werewolves and lesser undead. Only Dracula himself is shown to be stronger than her. One of her most crucial abilities is a sixth sense which enables her to perceive the darker natures within a person or thing. This allows her to track supernatural creatures of demonic origin as well as break through any glamours or shape-shifting powers they use to appear human. Her reflexes and combat prowess is likewise preternatural; able to sidestep bullets fired at close range and engage multiple inhuman opponents in quick succession. Her knowledge of occult lore lets her exploit a creature's innate weaknesses against them - silver, holy water, etc.

Eva is also shown to be exceptionally resilient; able to recover from most injuries faster than a human. Although it is not as potent as a conventional healing factor, she can recover from gunshot wounds and even being impaled through the stomach after falling from a church tower. Despite being human, Eva seems to have inherited her father's agelessness as well. She retains the youth and vitality of a woman in her prime even into the present day, despite being born in the late 1400s. Whether this makes her truly immortal like a vampire remains unexplored. Beyond her physical attributes, Eva is trained in the use of traditional melee weapons with a preference for samurai cutlery such as katanas and shurikens - all of which are fashioned from a silver-steel compound to allow for tensile strength and effectiveness against werewolves.

Appearances in Dynamite Entertainment comics
 Army of Darkness: Ash vs. The Classic Monsters (AKA Ash vs. Dracula) (2006)
 Eva: Daughter of The Dragon (One-Shot) (2007)
 The Darkness vs. Eva (2008)
 Hack/Slash/Eva: Monster's Ball (2011)
 Prophecy (2012)
 Vampirella Halloween Special 2013 (2013)
 Swords of Sorrow (2015)
 Army of Darkness: Furious Road (2015-2016)

References

Comics characters with accelerated healing
Dynamite Entertainment characters